Pierre Dieudonné (born 24 March 1947 in Brussels) is a Belgian auto racing driver and motoring journalist.

Career
He spent a large part of his career competing in touring car racing. He twice finished third in the European Touring Car Championship in 1977 and 1979. He won two consecutive Spa 24 Hours in 1974 and 1975 with a BMW 3.0 CSi. He won the title again in 1981 alongside Tom Walkinshaw in a Mazda RX-7.

In 1987 he competed in the inaugural World Touring Car Championship for the Eggenberger Motorsport works Ford team driving the RS Cosworth and RS500 versions of the Ford Sierra. His teammates for the championship were West German pair Klaus Ludwig and Klaus Niedzwiedz and Englishman Steve Soper, who was his regular co-driver. He won Round 8 of the championship, the Bob Jane T-Marts 500 at the Calder Park Raceway in Australia, which was run on a combined road course and the NASCAR-style "Thunderdome" high-banked oval, driving with Soper, and finished fifth in the championship (Dieudonné and Soper had won the Bathurst 1000 in Australia the week before the Calder race, but were disqualified for illegal wheel arch modifications). He finished third in the ETCC in the 1988 season, again for Eggenberger. Dieudonné competed in one round of the 1989 British Touring Car Championship for JQF Engineering with Chris Hodgetts in a Ford Sierra RS500. That same year he was a 1989 24 Hours of Le Mans GTP Class winner with Hodgetts and David Kennedy for Mazdaspeed. The 1991 24 Hours of Le Mans saw him finish eighth for Mazdaspeed in a Mazda 787 in the C2 Class.

Dieudonné also made the trip to Australia on other occasions to drive in the Bathurst 1000. After the 1987 disqualification, he returned in 1988 to drive a Sierra alongside Andrew Bagnall (Bagnall's Sierra was an Andy Rouse 'kit car', Rouse being the pioneer of racing Sierras in Europe and one of the main Sierra's rivals to the Eggenberger team). After Dieudonné qualified the car in 7th place, the car ran into overheating problems and only lasted nine of the scheduled 161 laps. He returned in 1989 to drive an Eggenberger built Sierra for Allan Moffat Racing with Gregg Hansford, the pair qualified 14th but the car was out after only 30 laps. Again racing for Moffat in 1990, "The Dude" (as he was known in Australia) drove both team cars, recording a DNF in the car he shared with Hansford and Niedzwiedz, and 10th in the teams lead car with Niedzwiedz and Biela in what was his last race at the Mount Panorama Circuit.

Career results

Complete World Touring Car Championship results
(key) (Races in bold indicate pole position) (Races in italics indicate fastest lap)

Silverstone shows overall results for all cars. For registered WTCC cars, Dieudonné finished 7th in points and 2nd in class.

Complete Asia-Pacific Touring Car Championship results
(key) (Races in bold indicate pole position) (Races in italics indicate fastest lap)

Complete British Touring Car Championship results
(key) (Races in bold indicate pole position; races in italics indicate fastest lap.)

‡ Endurance driver.

Complete Deutsche Tourenwagen Meisterschaft results
(key) (Races in bold indicate pole position) (Races in italics indicate fastest lap)

Complete 24 Hours of Le Mans results

Complete Spa 24 Hour results

Complete Bathurst 1000 results

References

External links
Pierre Dieudonné at driver database
Career highlights at race driver archive
History of Touring Car Racing

Belgian racing drivers
British Touring Car Championship drivers
European Touring Car Championship drivers
World Sportscar Championship drivers
World Touring Car Championship drivers
1947 births
24 Hours of Le Mans drivers
24 Hours of Spa drivers
Living people
Racing drivers from Brussels
Australian Endurance Championship drivers
Oreca drivers